Georgios Kostis (born 7 October 1972) is a retired Greek football midfielder and later manager.

References

1972 births
Living people
Greek footballers
1. FC Nürnberg II players
Iraklis Thessaloniki F.C. players
Panachaiki F.C. players
Olympiacos Volos F.C. players
Olympiakos Nicosia players
AEP Paphos FC players
Doxa Katokopias FC players
Omonia Aradippou players
Super League Greece players
Cypriot First Division players
Association football wingers
Greek expatriate footballers
Expatriate footballers in Germany
Greek expatriate sportspeople in Germany
Expatriate footballers in Cyprus
Greek expatriate sportspeople in Cyprus
Greek football managers
Greek expatriate sportspeople in China
Footballers from Trikala